High Orchard Bridge is a bridge over the Gloucester and Sharpness Canal in High Orchard in the city of Gloucester, England. It was opened in 2008 to carry the newly constructed St Ann Way over the canal. In 2012, Marstons pub company opened a brand new pub on the land next to the bridge and named it after the bridge “The High Orchard” which has since gone on to be one of Gloucester’s busiest pubs.

See also
 Llanthony Road Bridge

References

External links 

Bridges in Gloucestershire
Buildings and structures in Gloucester
Bridges completed in 2008
2008 establishments in England